is a Japanese term for a character who appears to not have emotions. They are often stoic, expressionless, and remain calm in stressful situations.

In contrast to tsundere and yandere characters, whose archetypes revolve around change in their behavior, kuudere characters often keep the same core traits throughout a narrative. Other kuudere characters traits include being aloof, level-headed, and serving as the voice of reason during conflict.

The term refers to one of four popular Japanese character types, the others being tsundere, yandere, and dandere.
 Rei Ayanami of Neon Genesis Evangelion is thought to have played a major role in the popularization of kuudere.

Relation to tsundere 
In his 2008 paper on the tsundere character archetype, Professor Junichi Togashi of Daito Bunka University mentioned that tsundere characters who do not use standard tsundere expressions could be classified as kuudere.

In the book "Basic Knowledge of Modern Terminology 2007", it is stated that sunao kuuru (素直クール) ('honest cool') can be thought of as the opposite of tsundere. The term is used to refer to characters who casually mention strange topics in a calm and irreverent manner, causing embarrassment to the listener. This term has since been used to refer to both kuudere and tsundere characters.

Examples in media 
 Rei Ayanami from Neon Genesis Evangelion
 C.C. from Code Geass
 Kyoko Kirigiri from Danganronpa
 Yuki Nagato from Haruhi Suzumiya
 Kanade Tachibana from Angel Beats

See also

 Apathy
 Reduced affect display
 Glossary of anime and manga

References

Further reading

Anime and manga terminology
Female stock characters in anime and manga
Japanese slang